Arcade Hotel is a historic hotel located at Hartsville, Darlington County, South Carolina.  It was built in 1913, and is a three-story, brick, L-plan building with a one-story rear wing. The front facade features a rusticated first floor, and an entrance portico with two paneled brick pillars.

It was listed on the National Register of Historic Places in 1986 and is today home of SPC Credit Union.

References

Hotel buildings on the National Register of Historic Places in South Carolina
Hotel buildings completed in 1913
Buildings and structures in Hartsville, South Carolina
National Register of Historic Places in Darlington County, South Carolina
1913 establishments in South Carolina